Vennala is a region in the city of Kochi in the state of Kerala, India. It was one of the early panchayats of Kerala, that was amalgamated with other panchayats during the formation of Kochi corporation. Located at around 6 km from the city center, it spans the area from Alinchuvadu to Arkakkadavu and from Kottenkavu to Padivattom.

The famous Vennala Mahadeva temple and Kottangavu Bhagavathi, Mangala temple are located here.
Vennala Sneham Mathrubhumi study circle, Century club, Vennala Abhayamatha Church, Vennala St. Mathews Church and Vennala Govt. HSS, Absolute academy are in this circle. The mosque called "Vadakaneith Pally" is also located here. Its

vennala hosted the India's first professional Club "F C COCHIN".

Ernakulam Medical Centre is a multi-speciality hospital located in this suburb. World-renowned Center for Marriage Counseling and Teenage Guidance "Consilium Institute of Professional Psychology" (headed by Dr George J. Kaliaden) is located at Palachuvad, next to Vennala.

Almeka Medical Centre is a specialists’ centre for skin laser and cosmetic treatments located in this suburb.

Bharat Petroleum refueling station "Vennala Fuels" also adds value to this township. Its proximity to Vyttila bus terminal has been attracting many builders to develop residential neighborhoods across this region.                     

There are some bank branches in located there State Bank of India (2branches), Panjab National Bank, Axis Bank.

 St George Church is situated here

Location

References

Neighbourhoods in Kochi